The Rocky Mountain Biological Laboratory  (also known by its acronym RMBL — pronounced 'rumble') is a high-altitude biological field station located near Crested Butte, in the abandoned mining town of Gothic, Colorado in the West Elk Mountains. The laboratory was founded in 1928. Research areas include the ecology of the region, climate change, pollination biology, and a long-running study of the yellow-bellied marmot. The laboratory offers courses for undergraduate students, including National Science Foundation-funded REU students, and provides support for researchers from universities and colleges.

History
RMBL was founded in 1928 on the remains of an abandoned mining town in Gothic, Colorado.  Approximately 180 people are in residence there during the summer field season. Over 1500 scientific publications have been based on work from the Laboratory (currently 30–50 per year).

Research
The diversity and depth of research at the lab make the area around Gothic, Colorado a well-understood ecosystem.  While scientists can use RMBL's facilities to study any topics relevant to the ecosystems around the Lab, a number of particular research areas have emerged as topics of particular interests. Charles Remington, an influential figure in the study of butterflies, spent a number of years working on the genetics of butterflies at the Lab.  A number of other scientists, such as Paul R. Ehrlich, Carol Boggs, Ward Watt (former President of the California Academy of Sciences), Maureen Stanton, and Naomi Pierce, have also spent time working on butterflies at the Lab.

Among the geneticists who took their work to RMBL in the summer months was Edward Novitski, whose research in Drosophila melanogaster led to the posthumous creation of the Edward Novitski Prize, awarded by the Genetics Society of America to recognize an extraordinary level of creativity and intellectual ingenuity in solving significant problems in genetics research.

Climate change is another well-studied area at RMBL, fueled by researchers such as John Harte, who has been heating a Rocky Mountain meadow to measure the effects of long-term warming on soil moisture, nutrient cycling, and plant communities.

Pollination biology is another historical research strength of the lab, and close to a hundred scientists who work in that field have visited or worked there since the 1970s.  Because 'introduced honeybees' do not survive at higher elevations such as the RMBL, a number of scientists, including Nickolas Waser, Mary Price, James Thomson, Diane Campbell, and David Inouye, who are interested in native pollination systems continue to work at the Lab.

The lab is home to one of the longest-running mark-recapture studies of a non-game animal in the world. Ken Armitage started a study of yellow-bellied marmots in 1962 and it has been continued by Dan Blumstein.  It is also home to one of the longest-running records of flowering phenology in North America, started in 1973 and continued to the present by David Inouye and his collaborators.

Stream ecology is another research focus. David Allan conducted work on streams around the lab in the 1970s.  Barbara Peckarsky, one of the world's top stream ecologists, has worked on the streams for 30+ years along with collaborators from around the world.

Not to be forgotten, Rocky Mountain Biological Laboratory also has studied the interplay between bacteria and ticks ("arthropods") since the Cold War era, which include Lyme disease bacterial variants Borrelia burgdorferi and Rickettsia rickettsii.

A number of scientists who have had an influence on environmental policy have also worked at the lab, including John P. Holdren, President Obama's National Science Advisor, Paul Ehrlich (author of The Population Bomb, and member of the National Academy of Sciences), Michael Soulé (founder of the Society for Conservation Biology),  John Cairns (member of the National Academy of Sciences), and Theo Colborn (author of Our Stolen Future).

Some of the more rambunctious scientists from RMBL have adopted a tradition of publicizing their work by marching in the Crested Butte, Colorado Fourth of July parade wearing leaf skirts made of corn lily (false skunk cabbage), and playing "trombones, kazoos, pots and pans".

RMBL is a member of the Organization of Biological Field Stations.

References

External links

Ecology organizations
Rocky Mountains
1928 establishments in Colorado